Naharkatia (previously spelt as Naharkatiya or Nahorkatiya) is a town and a town area committee in Dibrugarh district in the Indian state of Assam. It is well known for petroleum and gas reserves. Earlier, Duliajan, the head office town of Oil India Limited was in its circle. However, the towns are close, within a 30-minute journey.

Culture
Bihu is the major indigenous festival of Assam. During Bohag Rangali Bihu season, a Bihu dance competition is held in Langharjan stadium. It is a week-long celebration for all the indigenous Assamese communities in the region.

Durga Puja is another local festival observed. The idol of the goddess Durga is worshiped and the town is decorated with lights and pandals. On the last day a procession is organized, known as Bhasan. In the past, prizes were given to the best Durga Puja Pandal Committee.

Sangken or the Water Festival is a festival celebrated in the month of April by the Tai Phake people and it continues to be a special attraction for tourists visiting Namphake village during this period.

Mangalbaria (Tuesday) Bazaar is the local market.

A sports stadium known as Langharjan Field is situated at the outskirts of the town.

Demographics
According to the 2011 India census, Naharkatia had a population of 18,937 which 9,790 are males while 9,147 are females. Naharkatia has an literacy rate of 87.29%, higher than the state average of 72.19%; male literacy is 91.23%, and female literacy is 83.08%. In Naharkatia, 9.76% of the population is under 6 years of age.

The town is an amalgamation of many communities, mainly Assamese, Bengali, Indian Gorkha, Bihari and many Marwari people reside in the town area. A few Punjabi families have also lived in the town for many years.

About six kilometers from the town, a village named, 'Namphake' is situated which is the largest village inhabited by the Tai-Phake people in Assam. This village houses a Buddhist monastery and handicrafts woven by them are very beautiful. The monastery is a tourist attraction and is considered to be meditation center in a serene atmosphere. The town is more attractive due to the three tea estates.

There are also few Bodo, Manipuri families who reside outside the town.

Language

Assamese is the most spoken language at 8,307  speakers, followed by Bangla at 5,141, Hindi is spoken by 3,133 people, Odia at 707 and Nepali at 270.

Economy
The town is a commercial hub for nearby tea gardens and villages.

A few kilometres away, a rainforest is found along Joypur and cross it to get into Arunachal Pradesh. The illegal wood business has been minimized by regulation.

Education
 Naharkatiya College (1964): Offers higher secondary and bachelor's degrees in Arts and Commerce and has a study center of Krishna Kanta Handiqui State Open University (KKHSOU).
 Naharkatia Higher Secondary School (Class VI - XII) (1939):  Assamese Medium school with Arts, Science and Vocational studies in Higher Secondary Section.
 St. Mary's School, Naharkatia (1958) (English medium): The school initially had class L.K.G - Class X. Since 2008 the school has extended its education to higher secondary section and offers education in the Arts.
 Shankardev Sishu Niketan, Naharkatia (1998): An Assamese medium school. (Class Primary-X)
 Naharkatia Model High School
 Naharkatia Vidya Mandir School: A Bengali medium school (Class I-X).
 R.K. Jitani Hindi Vidyalaya: A Hindi medium school (Class i-X).
 St. Xavier School,NAharkatia
 Weingken English School
● Naharkatia New High School

Other educational institutions are Town MV School and Naharkatia Junior College.

Geography
Burhi Dihing, a tributary of Brahmaputra, flows through the town.

Sasoni Gojpuria, Gabhoru Dolong, Merbill Echo-Tourism, and Namphake are villages a few kilometres away.

History
The name Naharkatia is connected with the history of killing or punishment of Prince Nahar, an adopted son of the Tai-Ahom king Sukhampha, also known as Khora Raja, punished by Kalia Chaodang. According to local saying, 'one Ahom Noble Kalia Chaodang' was entrusted to punish Prince Nahar at Bardoiyamukh for his misdeeds against the important Tai-Ahom nobles including the Ministers. This Kalia alias Kola Chaodang was finally settled near today's Naharkatia Railway Station and from this episode, the area became Nahakatia. Nahar+katiya, i.e., the person who cut or beheaded Nahar at the instance of Tai-Ahom king Siukhampha settled there. Naharkatiya was frequented by many Indian royals, including Austric King Sung-Saumara, Kachari kings Bicharpatipha, Mahamanukyapha, Tai-Ahom kings Chaolung Siukapha, Siukhampha alias Khora Raja during the attack of Koch General Chilarai on the capital Gargaon in 1562. Jaydhvajsimha visited while in exile during the Mughal invasion by Nabab Mirjumla, 1662.
 
Burmese General Mingimaha Tilwa traveled this route to Mung-dun-chun-kham in the early part of the 19th century.
 
Ahom General Patalsing Barbarua founded Jaypur garh against the advancing Burmese through this route, finally sacrificing his life at the hands of the Burmese at Jeypore.

Sriram Ata founded his Vaisnavi Satra there. Nocte Chief Narottama accepted the Vaisnav faith there.
 
Near Naharkatiya, historical Tipam, Jaypur and Namrup (derived from Namruk) rests. The oldest oil pool is located there. It is famous for tea gardens. It produced athletes and sports organisers.

Organizations
 Asam Sahitya Sabha
 AASU
 ATASU
 AJYCP
 All Assam Gorkha Student Union
 AATSA
 NYS (Naharkatia Yuva Samaj)

Politics
Naharkatia is the 120th Assembly constituency of Assam, which is a part of Dibrugarh (Lok Sabha constituency).

Members of Legislative Assembly

 1978: Sasha Kamal Handique, Communist Party of India (Marxist).
 1985: Kusumbar Tairai, Independent.
 1991: Sasha Kamal Handique, Communist Party of India (Marxist).
 1996: Pranati Phukan, Indian National Congress.
 2000: Pranati Phukan, Indian National Congress.
 2001: Pranati Phukan, Indian National Congress.
 2006: Pranati Phukan, Indian National Congress.
 2011: Pranati Phukan, Indian National Congress.
 2016: Naren Sonowal, Asom Gana Parishad.
2020: Taranga Gogoi, Bharatiya Janata Party.

Sports
Naharkatia is very active town when talked about sports. It has given birth to several sports-person representing the state and the nation. The natives are very good with football, cricket, hockey, handball and chess. The youths are more drawn towards cricket and tae-kwon-do (Korean martial arts).

Transport
The Naharkatia Railway station serves as the railhead. Buses run frequently to and from Duliajan, Namrup, Tinsukia, Dibrugarh, Moran, Guwahati, Jorhat and Sibsagar.

References

See also
 Naharkatiya College

Cities and towns in Dibrugarh district
Dibrugarh